Louisa Smits is a former Belgian racing cyclist. She won the Belgian national road race title in 1965.

References

External links

Year of birth missing (living people)
Living people
Belgian female cyclists
Place of birth missing (living people)
People from Malle
Cyclists from Antwerp Province